Edh or EDH may refer to:

 Edh (Ð ð), a letter
 El Dorado Hills, California, United States
 Elder Dragon Highlander, a variant format for the card game Magic: The Gathering
 Électricité d'Haïti, the largely government-owned electricity sector in Haiti
 Enterprise data hub, a data hub model for big data management based on the Hadoop platform as a central data repository
 Ephemeral Diffie–Hellman, a method in public-key cryptography
 Error Detection and Handling, a digital television protocol
 Extradural haematoma